Shannon is an unincorporated community and census-designated place (CDP) in Floyd County, Georgia, United States. It is part of the Rome, Georgia Metropolitan Statistical Area. The population was 1,862 at the 2010 census.

History
The first settlement at Shannon, first called Ridge Valley, then Hermitage, was made in the 1830s.

Geography

Shannon is located in northeastern Floyd County between Rome and Calhoun, just off Highway 53.

Demographics

2020 census

As of the 2020 United States census, there were 1,919 people, 784 households, and 546 families residing in the CDP.

2000 census
As of the census of 2000, there were 1,682 people, 678 households, and 494 families residing in the CDP. The racial makeup of the CDP was 95.24% White, 1.19% African American, 0.12% Native American, 0.30% Asian, 0.48% from other races, and 2.68% from two or more races. Hispanic or Latino of any race were 1.25% of the population.

There were 678 households, out of which 29.8% had children under the age of 18 living with them, 57.7% were married couples living together, 11.2% had a female householder with no husband present, and 27.0% were non-families. 22.6% of all households were made up of individuals, and 12.4% had someone living alone who was 65 years of age or older.  The average household size was 2.48 and the average family size was 2.91.

In the CDP, the population was spread out, with 23.4% under the age of 18, 7.7% from 18 to 24, 27.8% from 25 to 44, 24.3% from 45 to 64, and 16.8% who were 65 years of age or older.  The median age was 39 years. For every 100 females, there were 93.3 males.  For every 100 females age 18 and over, there were 89.6 males.

The median income for a household in the CDP was $41,144, and the median income for a family was $42,578. Males had a median income of $30,181 versus $22,000 for females. The per capita income for the CDP was $17,565.  About 6.4% of families and 5.8% of the population were below the poverty line, including 6.3% of those under age 18 and 16.9% of those age 65 or over.

Climate
The climate in this area is characterized by relatively high temperatures and evenly distributed precipitation throughout the year.  According to the Köppen Climate Classification system, Shannon has a humid subtropical climate, abbreviated "Cfa" on climate maps.

Education
Shannon is in the Floyd County School District. The zoned secondary schools are Model Middle School and Model High School.

Notable person
Hal Griggs, baseball player

References

External links
 Hermitage historical marker

Census-designated places in Floyd County, Georgia
Census-designated places in Georgia (U.S. state)
Unincorporated communities in Floyd County, Georgia
Unincorporated communities in Georgia (U.S. state)